The Mangaotaki River is a river of the southern Waikato region of New Zealand's North Island.

The river at that point is too polluted for swimming.

One of its upper tributaries is the Waitanguru Stream, which has Waitanguru Falls on it.

The New Zealand Ministry for Culture and Heritage gives a translation of "stream of oratory" for Mangaotaki.

See also
List of rivers of New Zealand

References

Waitomo District
Rivers of Waikato
Rivers of New Zealand